The Tsavo Man-Eaters were a pair of man-eating male lions in the Tsavo region of Kenya, which were responsible for the deaths of many construction workers on the Kenya-Uganda Railway between March and December 1898. The lion pair was said to have killed 135 people. While the terrors of man-eating lions weren't new in the British public perception, the Tsavo Man-Eaters became one of the most notorious instances of dangers posed to Indian and native African workers of the Uganda Railway. They were eventually killed by Lieutenant Colonel John Henry Patterson, who wrote his account of his hunting experience in a semi-biography The Man-Eaters of Tsavo.

Today, the Tsavo Man-Eaters are the most widely studied man-eating pantherine cats given their behavior of hunting humans as a pair as well as dental injuries reported in one of the lions, a cause commonly attributed to big cats turning to humans as prey.

Historical information

The killings start

As part of the construction of a railway linking Uganda with the Indian Ocean at Kilindini Harbour, in March 1898 the British started building a railway bridge over the Tsavo River in Kenya. The project was led by Lieutenant-Colonel John Henry Patterson, who arrived just days before the disappearances and killings began. During the next nine months of construction, two maneless male Tsavo lions stalked the campsite, dragging workers from their tents at night, devouring them. There was an interval of several months when the attacks ceased, but word trickled in from other nearby settlements of similar lion attacks. When the lions returned the attacks intensified, with almost daily killings. Crews tried to scare off the lions and built campfires and bomas, or thorn fences made of whistling thorn trees around their camp for protection to keep the man-eaters out, all to no avail; the lions leaped over or crawled through the thorn fences. Patterson noted that early in their killing spree only one lion at a time would enter the inhabited areas and seize victims, but later they became more brazen, entering together and each seizing a victim.

As the attacks mounted, hundreds of workers fled from Tsavo, halting construction on the bridge. At this point, colonial officials began to intervene. According to Patterson, even the District Officer, Mr. Whitehead, narrowly escaped being killed by one of the lions after arriving at the Tsavo train depot in the evening. However, his assistant, Abdullah, was killed while Whitehead escaped with four claw lacerations running down his back.

Hunting the lions
Eventually other officials arrived, with a reinforcement of around twenty armed Sepoys to assist in the hunt. Patterson set traps and tried several times to ambush the lions at night from a tree. After repeated unsuccessful attempts, he shot the first lion on 9 December 1898. Twenty days later, the second lion was found and killed. The first lion killed measured  from nose to tip of tail. It took eight men to carry the carcass back to camp.

Patterson wrote in his account that he wounded the first lion with one bullet from a high-calibre rifle. This shot struck the lion in its hind leg, but it escaped. Later, it returned at night and began stalking Patterson as he tried to hunt it. He shot it through the shoulder, penetrating its heart with a more powerful rifle and found it lying dead the next morning not far from his platform.

The second lion was shot nine times, five with the same rifle, three with a second, and once with a third rifle – six finding their mark. The first shot was fired from atop a scaffolding that Patterson had built near a goat killed by the lion. Two shots from a second rifle hit the lion eleven days later as it was stalking Patterson and trying to flee. When they found the lion the next day, Patterson shot it three more times with the same rifle, severely crippling it, and he shot it three times with a third rifle, twice in the chest, and once in the head, which killed it. He claimed it died gnawing on a fallen tree branch, still trying to reach him.

Works resume
The construction crew returned and finished the bridge in February 1899. The exact number of people killed by the lions is unclear. Patterson gave several figures, overall claiming that there were 135 victims. At the end of the crisis, the Prime Minister of the United Kingdom, Lord Salisbury, addressed the House of Lords on the subject of the Tsavo man-eaters:

Museum display 
After 25 years as Patterson's floor rugs, the lions' skins were sold to the Field Museum of Natural History in 1924 for a sum of $5,000. The skins arrived at the museum in very poor condition. The lions were reconstructed and are now on permanent display along with their skulls.

Modern research 

In 2001, a review about causes for man-eating behaviour among lions revealed that the proposed human toll of 100 or more was most likely an exaggeration and that the more likely death toll was 28–31 victims. This reduced total was based on their review of Colonel Patterson's original journal, courtesy of Alan Patterson. However, the same study also noted that the journal refers only to Indian workers, and that Patterson stated that the casualties were much higher in the African worker population, but that those numbers were not documented.

The two lion specimens in Chicago's Field Museum are known as FMNH 23970, the 'standing' mount, killed on 9 December 1898, and FMNH 23969, the 'crouching' mount, killed on 29 December 1898. Recent studies on the isotopic signature analysis of Δ13C and Nitrogen-15 in their bone collagen and hair keratin were published in 2009. Using realistic assumptions on the consumable tissue per victim, lion energetic needs, and their assimilation efficiencies, researchers compared the man-eaters' Δ13C signatures to various reference standards: Tsavo lions with normal (wildlife) diets, grazers and browsers from Tsavo East and Tsavo West, and the skeletal remains of Taita people from the early 20th century.  Interpolation of their estimates across the 9 months of recorded man-eating behavior suggested that FMNH 23969 ate the equivalent of 10.5 humans and that FMNH 23970 ate 24.2 humans.

The scientific analysis does not differentiate between entire human corpses consumed, compared to parts of individual prey, since the attacks often raised alarm forcing the lions to slink back into the surrounding area. Many workers over the long construction period went missing, died in accidents, or simply left out of fear; so it is likely almost all of the builders, who stayed on, knew someone missing or supposedly eaten. It appears that Colonel Patterson may have exaggerated his claims as have subsequent investigators (e.g. "135 armed men", Neiburger and Patterson, 2000) though none of these modern studies have taken into account the people who were killed but not eaten by the animals. The diet of the victims would also affect their isotopic signature. A low meat diet would produce a signature more typical of herbivores in the victims, affecting the outcome of the test. That fact is important to note since many of the workers at Tsavo were Hindus and may have had a vegetarian diet.  This research also excludes, but does not disprove, the claims that the lions were not eating the victims they killed but merely killing just to kill. Similar claims have been made of other wildlife predators.

Possible causes of "man-eating" behavior 
Theories for the man-eating behaviour of lions have been reviewed by Peterhans and Gnoske, as well as Dr. Bruce D. Patterson (2004). Their discussions include the following: 
An outbreak of rinderpest (cattle plague) in 1898 (see 1890s African rinderpest epizootic) devastated the lions' usual prey, forcing them to find alternative food sources.
The Tsavo lions may have been accustomed to finding dead humans at the Tsavo River crossing. Slave caravans to the center of the East African slave trade, Zanzibar, routinely crossed the river there.

An alternative argument indicates that the first lion had a severely damaged tooth that would have compromised its ability to kill natural prey. However, this theory has been generally disregarded by the general public, and Colonel Patterson, who killed the lions, personally disclaimed it, saying that he damaged that tooth with his rifle while the lion charged him one night, prompting it to flee.

Studies indicate the lions ate humans as a supplement to other food, not as a last resort. Eating humans was probably an alternative to hunting or scavenging caused by dental disease and/or a limited number of prey.

A 2017 study carried out by the team of Dr. Bruce Patterson found that one of the lions had an infection at the root of his canine tooth, which made it hard for that particular lion to hunt. Lions normally use their jaws to grab prey like zebras and wildebeests and suffocate them.

Popular culture

In film 
Patterson's book was the basis for several films: 
 Men Against the Sun (1952) – shot on location in Kenya, an ambitious feat at the time
 Bwana Devil (1952)
 Killers of Kilimanjaro (1959)
 The Ghost and the Darkness (1996) – a film in which Val Kilmer plays John Henry Patterson
 Prey (South Africa, 2007)
Prooi (Netherlands, 2016)

In games 
 The lions appear as a difficulty to be overcome in the "Cape to Cairo" scenario of the video game Railroad Tycoon II.
 Tsavo'ka (translation: Ghost in the Darkness) is a rare tiger that can be found on the Timeless Isle in World of Warcraft.
 In Cabela's Dangerous Hunts 2011 the lions were mentioned by the character Mbeki to the main character Cole as he was telling him about mysterious animals that have been terrorizing local villages.
 Tsavo mane lengths exist in the online game Lioden, as well as Tsavo NPCs that players can battle with.

See also 
 History of Kenya
 Mfuwe man eating lion
 The Man-eaters of Tsavo (the book)
 W. D. M. Bell

References

Further reading

Sources 
 The Man-Eaters of Tsavo at Wikisource

External links 
 Field Museum of Natural History – Tsavo Lion Exhibit
 Guide to resources related to the Tsavo Lions at the Field Museum Library
 Journal: man-eaters of Tsavo – Natural History, November 1998 (via FindArticles.com)
 Man-Eating Lions Not Aberrant, Experts Say – National Geographic News, 4 January 2004

1898 animal deaths
1898 in rail transport
Collection of the Field Museum of Natural History
Deaths due to lion attacks
History of Kenya
Individual lions
Individual wild animals
Man-eaters
Uganda Railway
Panthera leo melanochaita